KRFC (88.9 MHz) is a community-based FM radio station in Fort Collins, Colorado. The station is owned and operated by Public Radio for the Front Range. The station's programming includes music of numerous genres, played by volunteer DJs.  Some news, information and syndicated shows are on the schedule as well.  Although similar in funding strategies to a traditional public radio station, KRFC is not a member of any of the major networks such as NPR or Pacifica.

KRFC has an effective radiated power (ERP) of 50,000 watts, with a signal extending from the Wyoming border to the suburbs of Denver.  The transmitter is on Weld County Route 80 near Route 17 in Severance, Colorado.

History
Public Radio for the Front Range (PRFR) was started by a group of former DJs from KCSU-FM. DJs who were not current students were forced to leave after KCSU-FM's underwriter, Colorado State University, decided to make KCSU-FM solely student-run. In September 1995, PRFR was given IRS 501(C)(3) non-profit status.

By the summer of 1996, PRFR had applied for a construction permit from the Federal Communications Commission (FCC).  The group wanted to build a station on 88.9 MHz.  But the PRFC was challenged by several Christian broadcasting groups. In 1997, PRFR went into negotiations with Colorado Christian University to share 88.9 MHz. These negotiations failed, and in the spring of 1998, PRFR applied for 89.7 MHz. In 2000, the group applied for a frequency in the low-power jurisdiction; another Christian group applied for the same frequency, leading to further delay.

Finally, after successful negotiations, PRFR came into agreement with the other applicants that the PRFR would receive 88.9 MHz. The agreement was submitted to the FCC on July 7, 2002.  The FCC granted PRFR a construction permit for a 3,000–watt non-commercial radio station. KRFC 88.9 FM Radio Fort Collins began broadcasting on March 1, 2003.

In 2004, KFRC completed the construction and expansion of its studios. Its facilities include three separate studios, all of which have the ability to broadcast live. Volunteers continue to make up the majority of KRFC 88.9 FM Radio Fort Collins' workforce.  In 2022, the station increased its power to 50,000 watts and constructed its own antenna tower.  This gives it a larger area of Colorado able to receive its signal.

The mission of KRFC 88.9 FM Radio Fort Collins is to make outstanding radio that entertains, informs, and inspires on local, regional, and global levels, that is volunteer powered and driven. As the voice of northern Colorado, KRFC has 180+ volunteers, including dozens of DJ’s programming 74 unique shows a week. KRFC is dedicated to supporting local businesses & nonprofits and is devoted to highlighting the incredible Colorado music scene. In addition to its over-the-air broadcasts, the station streams live at KRFCFM.ORG.

See also
List of community radio stations in the United States

References

External links
 KRFC 88.9 FM Radio Fort Collins Homepage
 

RFC
Community radio stations in the United States
Radio stations established in 2003